The 1951–52 season was Manchester United's 50th season in the Football League, and their seventh consecutive season in the top division of English football. They finished the season as champions for the first time in 41 years, securing their title on the final day of the season with a 6–1 home win over an Arsenal side who were their last remaining contenders in the race for the title.

United were still captained by Johnny Carey, who along with the likes of high scoring forward Jack Rowley had been at the club since before the war and helped them win the FA Cup in 1948, but by this stage most of the players from United's first postwar side were now in their thirties, and Busby was gradually replacing his older stars with younger players from the youth team. He made a club record move for Birmingham City winger Johnny Berry before the start of this title winning season, and also drafted in 22-year-old Roger Byrne from the reserve side to occupy the left wing, with Byrne scoring a host of crucial goals to help United clinch the title. Another young player who made his debut in the season, but did not play enough times to collect a championship medal, was the Belfast born teenager Jackie Blanchflower, who was equally capable as a half-back or inside-forward.

Friendlies

First Division

FA Cup

Squad statistics

References

Manchester United F.C. seasons
Manchester United
1952